The Volkswagen Sharan is a seven-seater minivan that was produced by the German Volkswagen Group and built at the AutoEuropa plant in Palmela, Portugal, with a front-wheel-drive version across two generations, from 1995 to 2022. Through badge engineering, the Volkswagen Sharan shares the same platform with the SEAT Alhambra, and the first generation was also in most respects identical to the Ford Galaxy. From 2010 to 2022 the Sharan was in its second generation. It is described in the motor industry as a multi-purpose vehicle (MPV). 


First generation (Typ 7M; 1995)

The Sharan was the Volkswagen-badged product from a joint venture between Volkswagen and Ford Motor Company to produce vehicles in the increasingly important MPV market, which was filled at the time by Renault's Espace and Chrysler's Voyager. The resulting Volkswagen Sharan concept (and Ford Galaxy) was shown at the 1994 Paris Auto Show, and production started in May 1995. The name Sharan was said to be derived from the Persian word 'Shahran' meaning "Carrier of Kings". However, according to Volkswagen, it is a made-up word, like 'Touran'.

Development began in top-secret in 1987, known only to the highest level members of the respective companies, with a team consisting of Ford's Steve Harper, Paul Coucill, and Volkswagen's Peter Knapp. Harper's design was chosen at the first review that September. It originally had a very different boxier design, and used a conventional minivan layout with a single sliding-door.

The Volkswagen Group subsequently rebadged the Sharan and sold it as the SEAT Alhambra alongside the Sharan. All variants were produced at the joint venture's plant AutoEuropa in Portugal, alongside the closely related Ford Galaxy. The Sharan was on sale from 1995 to 2010, accompanied with facelifts in 2000 and 2004.

As of 2007, the annual production for the Sharan is in the 50,000 unit range; it is sold in Europe, South Africa and some Asia Pacific and Latin American countries. In Mexico, it was available with the 1.8L Turbo 4 cil  with five speed Tiptronic automatic gearbox in Comfortline trim only, while in Argentina it is available with the 1.8L Turbo and the 1.9L TDI 115 hp four cylinder engines, in both five speed manual and five speed Tiptronic transmissions in Trendline trim only.

The cooperation between Volkswagen and Ford ended in 2006, with the latter going alone in building the second generation Galaxy.

The Sharan was not sold in the United States and Canada. Originally, this was due to an agreement between Ford and Volkswagen, leaving the market free from competition for Ford's Aerostar minivan. Volkswagen later decided not to introduce the Sharan in North America, ceased developing the Microbus concept, and instead introduced a badge-engineered variant of the Chrysler minivans as the Routan. This was launched in 2009, and replaced the Sharan in Mexico which was the only North American country where the Sharan was sold.

Scoring 200 points on the United Kingdom Reliability Index, the Sharan is considered very unreliable when compared to the average vehicle score of 100, while a very reliable vehicle scores 60 or below. The average age and repair cost of the tested Sharan was 5,3 years and covered 63,546 miles. It has been noted that, despite enjoying high popularity, the Sharan has consistently performed poorly in UK customer satisfaction surveys, including a last place 138th in a 2003 survey. Although quality problems existed in the original version, the Sharan quickly became the best selling MPV in Germany. It also sold better there than the technically identical SEAT Alhambra and Ford Galaxy despite costing up to 2500 euros more.

The first generation Volkswagen Sharan was on sale for over 15 years having been built almost unchanged during the time. By the time it was replaced in 2010 it was one of the longest running car models in Europe. Despite its age, nearly 24,000 Sharans were still being sold annually as of 2008. In total, Volkswagen sold almost 670,000 units of its Sharan.

Mark 1/Phase 1 (1995–2000)

The original Sharan was launched in August 1995, and was available with five engine choices:

*The 2.8 VR6 model had the option of Syncro all-wheel drive.

The design and technology of the Sharan (including Alhambra and Galaxy) was a mix between both Volkswagen and Ford. The design was a compromise solution, with the front looking similar to a Ford Mondeo Mk1 and the rear like Volkswagen Passat (B4). Each of the three MPV models had its own subtle differences in exterior, and, for the Galaxy, in interior design. The first generation's initial design was completed under Greg M Greeson, an American designer employed in Volkswagen's Advanced Design Studio in Düsseldorf, West Germany from 1989 to 1990.

Some small visual changes in 1998 included new door wings derived from the Volkswagen Golf Mk4 and some changes in the dashboard.

The Sharan received a Euro NCAP three star safety rating when it was tested in 1999.

Awards
1999 Auto Express New Car Honours – Best MPV
1998 Top Gear Magazine Top Cars – Best People Carrier (Joint Winner)
1996 What Car Awards – Best People Carrier (Joint Winner)
1996 Auto Express Awards – Best People Carrier (Joint Winner)

Mark 1A/Phase 1.5 (2000–2004)

The Sharan and its stablemates received a major facelift in May 2000. Seven seats came as standard.

Awards
2000 Auto Express New Car Honours – Best MPV

Engines

*Available option - 4motion AWD with 6 speed manual transmission

Mark 1B/Phase 1.75 (2004–2010)

A further minor cosmetic facelift was implemented in September 2003 at Frankfurt Motor Show for the model year of 2004. This changed, primarily, the grille, and tail lights (round). Also, more standard equipment was added, including air conditioning and curtain side air bags. In 2006, Ford independently introduced a new Galaxy which was not based on the Sharan and Alhambra designs from the Volkswagen Group. 

The new Galaxy was built at a dedicated Ford plant in Limburg, Belgium. The last first generation Ford Galaxy rolled off the AutoEuropa line at the end of 2005, while the first generation Sharan and SEAT Alhambra continued in production, alongside the Volkswagen Eos and the new Scirocco, until August 2010.

A BlueMotion variant was introduced in 2008 and went on sale in Germany in May 2008, with lower (159g/km) CO2 emissions and average fuel consumption of 38 mpg U.S. In the UK only 60 BlueMotions were expected to shift per year, and it was on sale there until February 2011.

Engines

LPG version
In June 2006, PrinceGas and Volkswagen launched the Sharan with a 2.0 L  flexible fuel engine, which could work with either petrol or autogas (liquified petroleum gas), providing an additional  range over the regular 2.0L petrol engine. Both fuel tanks, the 70L (18 US gallon) petrol tank and the 60L liquid gas tank combined, give the Sharan enough fuel to cover  between refuels at an average fuel consumption of 9.6 L/100 km.

The liquid gas tank is built into the spare wheel well so it does not compromise on passenger and loading space of the Sharan's interior, although it does eliminate the spare tyre.

Second generation (Typ 7N; 2010)

The second generation Sharan, based on the Volkswagen Passat (B7), was launched at the 2010 Geneva Motor Show and a month later, the second generation of its sibling model, the SEAT Alhambra, was officially announced. Sales commenced in September 2010.

The rear doors now slide open rather than being hinged.

In March 2020, Volkswagen ceased production of the Sharan MPV for the Chinese market in favor of the brand new model, China-only Volkswagen Viloran. Meanwhile, the car is still available in Europe after more than 12 years' presence.

The VW Sharan was discontinued in the UK in 2021 but continued to be available elsewhere in Europe. However, in October 2022, the VW Sharan finally ended production in Portugal after more than a decade of production of the second generation model. No replacement is planned as the market has shifted away from large MPV's to crossovers and SUV's.

Gallery

Facelift

At the 2015 Geneva Motor Show, a facelifted Sharan was unveiled to the public. It has new electronic systems and engines with reduced fuel consumption. Its 2.0 litre TSi engine and six speed direct-shift gearbox are the same as in the 2016 Golf GTi.

Safety

Euro NCAP 
The Sharan in its standard European configuration received 4 stars from Euro NCAP in 2019.

As public service vehicles

References

External links

 VW Sharan Website
SEAT Alhambra official website
 EuroNCAP test of the 1999 Volkswagen Sharan
 EuroNCAP test of the 2010 Volkswagen Sharan

Sharan
Minivans
Euro NCAP large MPVs
Front-wheel-drive vehicles
All-wheel-drive vehicles
2000s cars
2010s cars
Cars introduced in 1995
Cars powered by VR engines